The Real Howard Spitz is a 1998 family comedy film directed by Vadim Jean, produced by Paul Brooks and written by Jurgen Wolff. Starring Kelsey Grammer, Amanda Donohoe and Genevieve Tessier, it is a Canadian and U.K co-production. A failed detective writer, Howard Spitz has hit rock bottom until an 8-year-old girl helps him write children's books.

Plot
Howard Spitz is the author behind a string of poorly selling detective novels. He discovers that in contrast children's books enjoy strong sales. Believing it an easy way to make money, Spitz becomes a children's author with his new book character, a bovine detective named "Crafty Cow", but finds writing for his new audience significantly difficult.

Whilst doing research at the local library, he submits his drafts to a little girl called Samantha Kershaw who polishes them up. In return, she asks Spitz to find her father who left her mother before she was born. Spitz also discovers that to become a successful children's author he will need to do public appearances with his audience. Terrified at the prospect of having to spend time with children, Spitz hires a struggling actor to serve as his public face. But soon his doppelgänger is having delusions of grandeur, as his book becomes more and more successful.

Finally, at an awards ceremony, he confesses his identity, and finds that after spending so much time with Samantha, and after all the help she's given him, he feels more at ease around children.

Cast
Kelsey Grammer as Howard Spitz
Amanda Donohoe as Laura Kershaw
Genevieve Tessier as Samantha Kershaw
Joseph Rutten as Lou
Patrick McKenna as Roger
Kay Tremblay as Theodora Winkle
David Christoffel as Bill Sellers
Lex Gigeroff as Ronnie Relish
Gary Levert as Red Allen
Jeffrey Hirschfield as Lawrence
Denny Doherty as Balthazar Mishkin
Edward Gregson as Aaron
Joanne Hagen as Waitress
Justin Friesen as Lionel - TV Show Kid

Reception
Nick Griffiths, writing for Empire film magazine, noted that Kelsey Grammer "dominates the screen with a masterful blend of self-referential humour and Frasier-style sarcasm - despite having to spend much of the film dressed as his bovine protagonist." He concluded that "The script often threatens to plunge into family film saccharine, but is saved by Jean's assured direction, a performance well beyond her years from Tessier and an often hysterically funny turn from McKenna as moronic actor."

References

External links

1998 films
1998 comedy films
British comedy films
Canadian comedy films
English-language Canadian films
Films scored by John Murphy (composer)
Films about writers
Films directed by Vadim Jean
1990s English-language films
1990s Canadian films
1990s British films